The New Administrative Capital (NAC) is a new urban community in Cairo Governorate, Egypt and a satellite of Cairo City. It is planned to be Egypt's new capital and has been under construction since 2015. It was announced by the then Egyptian housing minister Mostafa Madbouly at the Egypt Economic Development Conference on 13 March 2015. The capital city is considered one of the projects for economic development, and is part of a larger initiative called Egypt Vision 2030.

The new capital of Egypt has yet to be given a name. A competition was launched on the new capital's website to choose a new name and logo for the city. A jury of specialists was formed to evaluate the proposals submitted to list and determine the best among all the proposals. No official results have yet been announced by the Egyptian Government. In October 2021, transportation minister Kamel al-Wazir indicated the city might be named Egypt. 

The new city is to be located 45 kilometres (28 miles) east of Cairo and just outside the Second Greater Cairo Ring Road, in a largely undeveloped area halfway to the seaport city of Suez. According to the plans, the city will become the new administrative and financial capital of Egypt, housing the main government departments and ministries and foreign embassies. On  total area, it would have a population of 6.5 million people, though it is estimated that the figure could rise to seven million.

Officially, a major reason for the undertaking of the project was to relieve congestion in Cairo, which is already one of the world's most crowded cities, with the population of Greater Cairo expected to double in the next few decades. Cairo, for comparison, has a metro population of nearly 20 million.

Plans 
The city is planned to consist of a government administrative district, diplomatic quarter, cultural district, central business district (CBD) and 21 residential districts. NAC is planned to be built in stages across the space of 170,000 feddans (714 km2/ 270 sq mi) with Phase 1 covering over 40,000 feddans - less than a quarter of the land allocated for city.

Some amenities planned for the city are a central park, artificial lakes, around 2,000 educational institutions, technology and innovation park, 18 hospitals, 1,250 mosques and churches, a 93,440-seat stadium, 40,000 hotel rooms, a major theme park four times the size of Disneyland, 90 square kilometers of solar energy farms and electric railway link with Cairo.

It will be built as a smart city with over 6,000 cameras monitoring the streets and along with this authorities will be using AI to monitor water use & waste management and residents will be able to submit complaints into a mobile app. It was originally planned that parliament, presidental palaces, government ministries & foreign embassies would be moved into the city between 2020 and 2022 but due to construction delays and Covid-19 the move has delayed and over 30,000 government employees will slowly start to move into the New Capital from March 2023. It is planned to cost over $100 million USD to move the government from Cairo to NAC but a full cost and timeline for the overall project has not yet been revealed.

Feedback on former experiences of capital relocation was looked at, for instance by meeting with representatives from Astana, which replaced Almaty as the capital city of Kazakhstan in 1997.

Finance and construction 
When the project was officially announced in March 2015, it was revealed that the Egyptian military had already begun building a road from Cairo to the site of the future capital.

The proposed builder of the city was Capital City Partners, a private real estate investment firm led by Emirati businessman Mohamed Alabbar.
But in September 2015, Egypt cancelled the memorandum of understanding (MoU) signed with Alabbar during the March economic summit, since they did not make any progress with the proposed plans.

In the same month Egypt signed a new MoU with China State Construction Engineering Corporation (CSCEC) to "study building and financing" the administrative part of the new capital, which will include ministries, government agencies and the president's office. However, CSCEC signed agreements with Egyptian authorities in 2017 to only develop the CBD.

This left the Egyptian government to finance and manage most of the construction, setting up the Administrative Capital Urban Development Company (ACUD) on 21 April 2016, an Egyptian joint stock company whose major shareholders are the Ministry of Defence (National Service Projects Authority and the Armed Forces Projects Authority) holding 51% by in-kind contribution of the land, and the Ministry of Housing's New Urban Communities Authority (NUCA), holding 49% of the shares via capital injection of EGP 20bn (US$2.2bn in 2016) and an authorised capital of EGP 204bn (US$22bn).

ACUD manages the planning, subdivision, infrastructure construction and sale of land parcels in conjenction with the New Administrative Capital Development Authority affiliated to NUCA, as the latter does with its other new towns.

State-owned construction company Arab Contractors was called for constructing the water supply and sewage lines to the new capital. The company stated that the studies needed were done in August and it is supposed that the project will take 3 months to supply the city with the main services needed in order to prepare it for the construction work.

Notable buildings

Cathedrals and mosques 
In January 2019, President Abdel Fattah al-Sisi inaugurated a large-scale cathedral and a mosque.

The Nativity of Christ Cathedral 
The Nativity of Christ is a mega-cathedral, the largest of its kind in Egypt and the Middle East. The cathedral serves the city's Coptic Orthodox community.

Al-Fattah Al-Aleem Mosque 
Al-Fattah Al-Aleem is a mega-mosque, the largest of its kind in Egypt.

Green River Park 
The Green River Park (also known as Capital Park) is an urban park planned to extend along the entirety of the new capital, representing the Nile river. The initial phase of the park will be of about the first  and is under construction.

The Octagon 
The Octagon (State's Strategic Leadership Centre) is Egypt's new Ministry of Defense headquarters. The complex is considered the largest of its kind in the Middle East and one of the largest in the world, much like The Pentagon in the United States of America.

Capital International Airport 
The Capital International Airport is the airport for Egypt's new capital, intended to relieve pressure on Cairo International Airport, serving Cairo, and the Sphinx International Airport, near the Giza Pyramids, serving Giza.

New Administrative Capital Stadium 
The New Administrative Capital Stadium (Sports City Stadium) is a sports stadium under construction since 2019. With an expected capacity of over 93,000 people, it will be the largest stadium in Egypt and the second largest in Africa, and is expected to replace the Cairo International Stadium as the new national stadium. It will be part of a larger Olympic sports complex.

Central business district

Skyscrapers and towers under construction

Iconic Tower 
Over 30 skyscrapers are under construction, including the Iconic Tower, set to be Egypt and Africa's largest skyscraper.

MU10

MU07

MU19

Future proposed towers

Oblisco Capitale 
The Oblisco Capitale is a planned and approved skyscraper set to be inaugurated in 2030.

Transportation 
The Cairo Light Rail Transit (abbreviated LRT) connects Cairo to the New Administrative Capital. The line starts at Adly Mansour Station at Al Salam City on Cairo Metro Line 3, and splits into two branches at Badr City. One runs northward, parallel to the Cairo Ring Road, to 10th of Ramadan City, while the other turns south towards the New Administrative Capital. Intermediate cities along the train's route include Obour, Shorouk, and Mostaqbal.

In addition, a monorail line under construction will connect Giza to the new capital passing through Cairo.

In January 2021, Egypt signed a contract with Siemens to construct a high speed rail line that extends from the northern Mediterranean city of El Alamein to Ain Sokhna city on the red sea passing through the new capital and Alexandria. The  line is expected to be finished by 2023.

The New Administrative Capital will be served by the new Capital International Airport. The airport includes a passenger terminal with a current capacity of 300 passengers per hour, eight parking spaces for aircraft, 45 service and administrative buildings, an air control tower and a  runway suitable for receiving large aircraft, equipped with lighting and automatic landing systems.

See also 

 List of purpose-built national capitals
 List of universities in Egypt
 Egypt Vision 2030
 New Alamein
 New Galala

References 

Economy of Egypt
Cities in Egypt
Proposed populated places
Egypt
Populated places in Cairo Governorate
New towns in Egypt